Shatori Walker-Kimbrough (born May 18, 1995) is an American professional basketball player  of the Women's National Basketball Association (WNBA), who is currently playing for the Washington Mystics. She was drafted with the sixth overall pick in the 2017 WNBA draft.

She is one of Western Pennsylvania's most decorated women's athletes in the region's history.

On April 15, 2020, the Washington Mystics traded Walker-Kimbrough to the New York Liberty in a deal that sent 2012 WNBA Most Valuable Player Tina Charles to Washington. Two days later, the New York Liberty traded her to the Phoenix Mercury on draft night in exchange for the draft rights of Jocelyn Willoughby.

Maryland statistics 

Source

WNBA career statistics

Regular season

|-
| style='text-align:left;'|2017
| style='text-align:left;'|Washington
| 27 || 8 || 12.4 || .371 || .333 || .854 || 1.1 || 0.4 || 0.6 || 0.1 || 0.6 || 4.4
|-
| style='text-align:left;'|2018
| style='text-align:left;'|Washington
| 19 || 1 || 8.8 || .429 || .304 || 1.000 || 0.8 || 0.4 || 0.4 || 0.3 || 0.8 || 3.5
|-
| style="text-align:left;background:#afe6ba;" | 2019†
| style='text-align:left;'|Washington
| 34 || 1 || 17.1 || .432 || .310 || .930 || 1.6 || 1.2 || 0.8 || 0.2 || 1.0 || 6.7
|-
| style='text-align:left;'|2020
| style='text-align:left;'|Phoenix
| 21 || 10 || 19.0 || .429 || .431 || .920 || 1.6 || 1.5 || 1.1 || 0.4 || 1.0 || 7.3
|-
| style='text-align:left;'|2021
| style='text-align:left;'|Connecticut
| 1 || 0 || 4.0 || .000 || .000 || .000 || 1.0 || 0.0 || 0.0 || 1.0 || 1.0 || 0.0
|-
| style='text-align:left;'|2021
| style='text-align:left;'|Washington
| 16 || 13 || 21.6 || .513 || .320 || .857 || 1.4 || 1.0 || 0.8 || 0.3 || 1.2 || 7.4
|-
| style='text-align:left;'|2022
| style='text-align:left;'|Washington
| 35 || 3 || 20.1 || .402 || .347 || .902 || 1.8 || 1.5 || 1.1 || 0.3 || 1.1 || 6.9
|-
| style='text-align:left;'| Career
| style='text-align:left;'| 6 years, 3 teams
| 153 || 36 || 16.6 || .423 || .345 || .900 || 1.4 || 1.1 || 0.8 || 0.3 || 1.0 || 6.0

Playoffs

|-
| align="left" | 2017
| align="left" | Washington
| 3 || 0 || 2.0 || .000 || .000 || .000 || 0.0 || 0.0 || 0.0 || 0.0 || 0.0 || 0.0
|-
| align="left" | 2018
| align="left" | Washington
| 4 || 0 || 2.3 || 1.000 || .000 || .000 || 0.3 || 0.0 || 0.3 || 0.0 || 0.3 || 1.5
|-
| style="text-align:left;background:#afe6ba;" | 2019†
| align="left" | Washington
| 8 || 0 || 7.0 || .412 || .429 || 1.000 || 0.4 || 0.4 || 0.3 || 0.1 || 0.5 || 2.4
|-
| align="left" | 2020
| align="left" | Phoenix
| 2 || 1 || 19.0 || .500 || .667 || .500 || 1.5 || 1.5 || 0.0 || 0.5 || 1.0 || 8.5
|-
| align="left" | 2022
| align="left" | Washington
| 2 || 0 || 20.5 || .556 || .500 || 1.000 || 0.0 || 0.5 || 1.5 || 0.0 || 0.5 || 7.5
|-
| align="left" | Career
| align="left" | 4 years, 2 teams
| 19 || 1 || 7.9 || .500 || .526 || .700 || 0.4 || 0.4 || 0.3 || 0.1 || 0.4 || 3.0
|}

References

1995 births
Living people
All-American college women's basketball players
American women's basketball players
Basketball players at the 2015 Pan American Games
Basketball players from Baltimore
Basketball players from Pennsylvania
Connecticut Sun players
Maryland Terrapins women's basketball players
Pan American Games medalists in basketball
Pan American Games silver medalists for the United States
Parade High School All-Americans (girls' basketball)
People from Aliquippa, Pennsylvania
Phoenix Mercury players
Shooting guards
Washington Mystics draft picks
Washington Mystics players
Medalists at the 2015 Pan American Games
United States women's national basketball team players